Mishe Mokwa may refer to:

 Misha Mokwa, Wisconsin, an unincorporated community
 Mishe Mokwa Trail, a trail in Santa Monica Mountains National Recreation Area, California
 Mishe Mokwa Creek, a waterway impounded by the Sherwood Dam in California
 Mishe-Mokwa, a passenger ferry on Lake Michigan, Michigan
 Mishe-Mokwa, a mythical bear in the epic poem The Song of Hiawatha